The Port Morant Formation is a geologic formation in Jamaica. It preserves fossils.

See also

 List of fossiliferous stratigraphic units in Jamaica

References
 

Geology of Jamaica